Phasis  may refer to:

Places and jurisdictions
 Phasis (river), modern-day Rioni River in western Georgia
 Phasis (town), an ancient town in the Phasis river delta, near modern-day Poti
 Phasis (titular see), a Latin Catholic titular see

Biology
 Phasis (butterfly), a genus of butterfly